Serbian epic poetry is a form of epic poetry created by Serbs originating in today's Serbia, Bosnia and Herzegovina, Croatia, Montenegro and North Macedonia. The main cycles were composed by unknown Serb authors between the 14th and 19th centuries. They are largely concerned with historical events and personages. The instrument accompanying the epic poetry is the gusle.

Serbian epic poetry helped in developing the Serbian national consciousness. The cycles of Prince Marko, the Hajduks and Uskoks inspired the Serbs to restore freedom and their heroic past. The Hajduks in particular, are seen as an integral part of national identity; in stories, the hajduks were heroes: they had played the role of the Serbian elite during Ottoman rule, they had defended the Serbs against Ottoman oppression, and prepared for the national liberation and contributed to it in the Serbian Revolution.

History
The earliest surviving record of an epic poem related to Serbian epic poetry is a ten verse fragment of a bugarštica song from 1497 in Southern Italy about the imprisonment of Sibinjanin Janko (John Hunyadi) by Đurađ Branković, however the regional origin and ethnic identity of its Slavic performers remains a matter of scholarly dispute. From at least the Ottoman period up until the present day, Serbian epic poetry was sung accompanied by the gusle and there are historical references to Serb performers playing the gusle at the Polish–Lithuanian royal courts in the 16th and 17th centuries, and later on in Ukraine and Hungary. Hungarian historian Sebestyén Tinódi wrote in 1554 that "there are many gusle players here in Hungary, but none is better at the Serbian style than Dimitrije Karaman", and described Karaman's performance to Turkish lord Uluman in 1551 in Lipova: the guslar would hold the gusle between his knees and go into a highly emotional artistic performance with a sad and dedicated expression on his face. Chronicler and poet Maciej Stryjkowski (1547–1582) included a verse mentions the Serbs singing heroic songs about ancestors fighting the Turks in his 1582 chronicle. Józef Bartłomiej Zimorowic used the phrase "to sing to the Serbian gusle" in his 1663 idyll Śpiewacy (Singers).

In 1824, Vuk Karadžić sent a copy of his folksong collection to Jacob Grimm, who was particularly enthralled by The Building of Skadar. Grimm translated it into German, and described it as "one of the most touching poems of all nations and all times".

Many of the epics are about the era of the Ottoman occupation of Serbia and the struggle for the liberation. With the efforts of ethnographer Vuk Karadžić, many of these epics and folk tales were collected and published in books in the first half of the 19th century. Up until that time, these poems and songs had been almost exclusively an oral tradition, transmitted by bards and singers. Among the books Karadžić published were:

A Small Simple-Folk Slavonic-Serbian Songbook, 1814; Serbian Folk Song-Book (Vols, I-IV, Leipzig edition, 1823-8133; Vols. I-IV, Vienna edition, 1841-1862)
Serbian Folk Tales (1821, with 166 riddles; and 1853)
Serbian Folk Proverbs and Other Common Expressions, 1834.
"Women's Songs" from Herzegovina (1866) - which was collected by Karadžić's collaborator and assistant Vuk Vrčević

These editions appeared in Europe when romanticism was in full bloom and there was much interest in Serbian folk poetry, including from Johann Gottfried Herder, Jacob Grimm, Goethe and Jernej Kopitar.

Gusle
 
The gusle instrumentally accompanies heroic songs (epic poetry) in the Balkans. The instrument is held vertically between the knees, with the left hand fingers on the neck. The strings are never pressed to the neck, giving a harmonic and unique sound. There is no consensus about the origin of the instrument, while some researchers believe it was brought with the Slavs to the Balkans, based on a 6th-century Byzantine source. Teodosije the Hilandarian (1246–1328) wrote that Stefan Nemanjić (r. 1196–1228) often entertained the Serbian nobility with musicians with drums and "gusle". Reliable written records about the gusle appear only in the 15th century. 16th-century travel memoirs mention the instrument in Bosnia and Serbia.

It is known that Serbs sang to the gusle during the Ottoman period. Notable Serbian performers played at the Polish royal courts in the 16th- and 17th centuries, and later on in Ukraine and in Hungary. There is an old mention in Serbo-Croatian literature that a Serbian guslar was present at the court of Władysław II Jagiełło in 1415. In a poem published in 1612, Kasper Miaskowski wrote that "the Serbian gusle and gaidas will overwhelm Shrove Tuesday". Józef Bartłomiej Zimorowic used the phrase "to sing to the Serbian gusle" in his 1663 idyll Śpiewacy ("Singers").

Corpus
The corpus of Serbian epic poetry is divided into cycles:
Non-historic cycle (Неисторијски циклус/Neistorijski ciklus) - poems about Slavic mythology, characteristically about dragons and nymphs
Pre-Kosovo cycle (Преткосовски циклус/Pretkosovski ciklus) - poems about events that predate the Battle of Kosovo (1389)
Kosovo cycle (Косовски циклус/Kosovski ciklus) - poems about events that happened just before and after the Battle of Kosovo
Post-Kosovo cycle (Покосовски циклус/Pokosovski ciklus) - poems about post-Battle events
Cycle of Kraljević Marko (Циклус Краљевића Марка/Ciklus Kraljevića Marka)
Cycle of hajduks and uskoks (Хајдучки и ускочки циклус, Хајдучке и ускочке песме) – poems about brigands and rebels
Poems about the liberation of Serbia and Montenegro (циклус ослобођења Србије, Песме о ослобођењу Србије и Црне Горе) - poems about the 19th-century battles against the Ottomans
Unsorted (Неразврстане/Nerazvrstane) – poems that do not belong to any of the cycles mentioned above

Poems depict historical events with varying degrees of accuracy.

Notable people
 Benedikt Kuripečič (16th century), diplomat who traveled through Ottoman Bosnia and Serbia in 1530 and recorded that epic songs about Miloš Obilić are popular not only among Serbs in Kosovo but also in Bosnia and Croatia. He also recorded some legends about the Battle of Kosovo.
 Dimitrije Karaman ( 1551), oldest known Serbian gusle player
 Avram Miletić (1755–after 1826), merchant and songwriter best known for writing the earliest collection of urban lyric poetry in Serbian.
 Old Rashko, one of the most important sources of epic poetry recorded by Vuk Karadžić.
 Filip Višnjić (1767–1834), Serbian guslar dubbed the "Serbian Homer" both for his blindness and poetic gift.
 Tešan Podrugović (1783–1815), Serb hajduk, storyteller and guslar who participated in the First Serbian Uprising and was one of the most important sources for Serbian epic poetry.
 Živana Antonijević (d. 1822), known as "Blind Živana", one of the favorite female singers of Vuk Karadžić.
 Vuk Karadžić (1787—1864) was a Serbian philologist and linguist who was the major reformer of the Serbian language. He deserves, perhaps, for his collections of songs, fairy tales, and riddles to be called the father of the study of Serbian folklore.
Vuk Vrčević (1811-1882), collector of lyric poetry
 Petar Perunović (1880–1952), known as "Perun", famous guslar who performed for Nikola Tesla and the first to record Serbian epic poetry in a studio.
Đuro Milutinović the Blind (1774–1844), guslar at Serbian court.

Characters
Medieval era
 Tsar Dušan, Emperor
 Prince Lazar, Prince and legendary Emperor
 Pavle Orlović, knight
 Milan Toplica, knight
 Ivan Kosančić, knight
 Jugović brothers, including Boško Jugović
 Beg Kostadin
 Miloš Vojinović
 Voivode Prijezda
 Mali Radojica, hajduk
 Deli Radivoje
 "Zmaj Ognjeni Vuk" (Vuk the Fiery Dragon), based on Vuk Grgurević, the Serbian Despot (r. 1471–85)
 Ailing Dojčin, possibly based on despots John VII Palaiologos and Andronikos Palaiologos
 Relja the Winged
 Pop Milo Jovović
 Bajo Pivljanin
 Stari Vujadin
 Alil-Aga
 Sibinjanin Janko
 Jug Bogdan
 Janko od Kotara
 Starina Novak (partly)
 Musa Kesedžija, enemy of Kraljević Marko, he is the result of merging several historical people including Musa Çelebi son of Bayezid I and Musa from the Muzaka Albanian noble family while Jovan Tomić believes he is based on the supporter of Jegen Osman Pasha 
 Djemo the Mountaineer, enemy of Kraljević Marko, a member of Muzaka noble family (Gjin Muzaka) or maybe Ottoman military person Jegen Osman Pasha
 General Vuča, enemy of Kraljević Marko, Tanush Dukagjin, a member of Dukagjini noble family or Prince Eugene of Savoy or Peter Doci
 Philip the Magyar, enemy of Kraljević Marko, Pipo of Ozora, an Italian condottiero, general, strategist and confidant of King Sigismund of Hungary.
 Arnaut Osman

Hajduk cycle
 Ognjen Hadzovic, hajduk, main character in Ženidba Hadzovic Ognjena.
 Srbin Tukelija, hajduk, main character in Boj Arađana s Komadincima.

Many other heroes of Serbian epic poetry are also based upon historical persons:
 Strahinja Banović — Đurađ II Stracimirović Balšić
 Jug Bogdan — Vratko Nemanjić
 Beg Kostadin — Constantine Dragaš
 Sibinjanin Janko — John Hunyadi
 Petar Dojčin — Petar Doci
 Maksim Crnojević — Staniša Skenderbeg Crnojević
 Bajo Pivljanin - Bajo Nikolić
 Mihajlo Svilojević — Michael Szilágyi
 Janko od Kotara - Janko Mitrović
 Manojlo Grčić - Manuel I Komnenos
 Relja the Winged - Hrelja
 Grujica Žeravica

Some heroes are paired with their horses, such as Prince Marko—Šarac, Vojvoda Momčilo—Jabučilo (a winged horse), Miloš Obilić—Ždralin, Damjan Jugović—Zelenko, Banović Strahinja—Đogin, Hajduk-Veljko—Kušlja, Jovan Kursula—Strina, Srđa Zlopogleđa—Vranac.

Excerpts

Slavic antithesis:

()

Modern example of Serbian epics as recorded in 1992 by film director Paweł Pawlikowski in a documentary for the BBC Serbian epics; an anonymous gusle singer compares Radovan Karadžić, as he prepares to depart for Geneva for peace talk, to Karađorđe, who had led the First Serbian Uprising against the Turks in 1804:

Quotes
  Jacob Grimm
  Charles Simic

Modern Serbian epic poetry
Epic poetry is recorded still today. Some modern songs are published in books or recorded, and under copyright, but some are in public domain, and modified by subsequent authors just like old ones. There are new songs that mimic old epic poetry, but are humorous and not epic in nature; these are also circulating around with no known author. In the latter half of the 19th century, a certain MP would exit the Serbian parliament each day, and tell of the debate over the monetary reform bill in the style of epic poetry. Modern epic heroes include: Radovan Karadžić, Ratko Mladić and Vojislav Šešelj. Topics include: Yugoslav wars, NATO bombing of Yugoslavia, and the Hague Tribunal.

Popular modern Serbian epic performers, guslari (Guslars) include: Milomir "Miljan" Miljanić, Đoko Koprivica, Boško Vujačić, Vlastimir Barać, Sava Stanišić, Miloš Šegrt, Saša Laketić and Milan Mrdović.

See also

 Gusle
 Bugarštica
 Erlangen Manuscript
 List of national poetries
 The Building of Skadar
 Serbian literature

References

Sources

Further reading

External links

 
The Battle of Kosovo - Serbian Epic Poems Preface by Charles Simic Swallow Press/Ohio University Press, Athens 1987

Audio
Lesson in rhyme
Poem for Karadjordje
Fate of vizier Mahmud-pasha in the village of Krusa
Pit of Korich Part 2 Part 3

 
Serbian culture
Serbian folklore
National symbols of Serbia